David Brandon may refer to:

 Dave Brandon (born 1952), American businessman
 David Brandon (American football) (born 1965), American football player
 David Brandon (architect) (1813–1897), Scottish architect
 David Brandon (actor) (born 1951), Irish actor